Glasnost is a concept relating to openness and transparency. It has several general and specific meanings, including a policy of maximum openness in the activities of state institutions and freedom of information and the inadmissibility of hushing up problems. It has been used in Russian to mean "openness and transparency" since at least the end of the 18th century.

In the Russian Empire of the late-19th century, the term was particularly associated with reforms of the judicial system. Among these were reforms permitting attendance of the press and the public at trials whose verdicts were now to be read aloud. Vladimir Lenin repeatedly emphasized the importance of glasnost as the most important feature of democracy. In the mid-1980s, it was popularised by Mikhail Gorbachev as a political slogan for increased government transparency in the Soviet Union.

Historical usage
Human rights activist Lyudmila Alexeyeva argues that the word glasnost has been in the Russian language for several hundred years as a common term: "It was in the dictionaries and lawbooks as long as there had been dictionaries and lawbooks. It was an ordinary, hardworking, non-descript word that was used to refer to a process, any process of justice or governance, being conducted in the open." In the mid-1960s it acquired a revived topical importance in discourse concerning the cold-war era internal policy of the Soviet Union.

In the USSR

The dissidents
On 5 December 1965 the Glasnost rally took place in Moscow, considered to be a key event in the emergence of the Soviet civil rights movement. Protesters on Pushkin Square led by Alexander Yesenin-Volpin demanded access to the closed trial of Yuly Daniel and Andrei Sinyavsky. The protestors made specific requests for "glasnost", herein referring to the specific admission of the public, independent observers and foreign journalists, to the trial that had been legislated in the then newly issued Code of Criminal Procedure. With a few specified exceptions, Article 111 of the Code stated that judicial hearings in the USSR should be held in public.

Such protests against closed trials continued throughout the post-Stalin era. Andrei Sakharov, for example, did not travel to Oslo to receive his Nobel Peace Prize due to his public protest outside a Vilnius court building demanding access to the 1976 trial of Sergei Kovalev, an editor of the Chronicle of Current Events and prominent rights activist.

Gorbachev
In 1986, Soviet General Secretary Mikhail Gorbachev and his advisers adopted glasnost as a political slogan, together with the term perestroika. Alexander Yakovlev, Head of the Propaganda Department of the Communist Party of the Soviet Union, is considered to be the intellectual force behind Gorbachev's reform program.

Glasnost was taken to mean increased openness and transparency in government institutions and activities in the Soviet Union (USSR). Glasnost reflected a commitment of the Gorbachev administration to allowing Soviet citizens to discuss publicly the problems of their system and potential solutions. Gorbachev encouraged popular scrutiny and criticism of leaders, as well as a certain level of exposure by the mass media. 

Some critics, especially among legal reformers and dissidents, regarded the Soviet authorities' new slogans as vague and limited alternatives to more basic liberties. Alexei Simonov, president of the Glasnost Defence Foundation, makes a critical definition of the term in suggesting it was "a tortoise crawling towards Freedom of Speech".

Various meanings
Between 1986 and 1991, during an era of reforms in the USSR, glasnost was frequently linked with other generalised concepts such as perestroika (literally: restructuring or regrouping) and demokratizatsiya (democratisation). Gorbachev often appealed to glasnost when promoting policies aimed at reducing corruption at the top of the Communist Party and the Soviet government, and moderating the abuse of administrative power in the Central Committee. The ambiguity of "glasnost" defines the distinctive five-year period (1986–1991) at the end of the USSR's existence. There was decreasing pre-publication and pre-broadcast censorship and greater freedom of information.

The "Era of Glasnost" saw greater contact between Soviet citizens and the Western world, particularly the United States: restrictions on travel were loosened for many Soviet citizens which further eased pressures on international exchange between the Soviet Union and the West.

International relations
Gorbachev's interpretation of "glasnost" can best be summarised in English as "openness". While associated with freedom of speech, the main goal of this policy was to make the country's management transparent, and circumvent the holding of near-complete control of the economy and bureaucracy of the Soviet Union by a concentrated body of officials and bureaucratic personnel. 

During Glasnost, Soviet history under Stalin was re-examined; censored literature in the libraries was made more widely available; and there was a greater freedom of speech for citizens and openness in the media. It was in the late 1980s when most people in the Soviet Union began to learn about the atrocities of Stalin, and learned about previously suppressed events. 

Information about the supposedly higher quality of consumer goods and quality of life in the United States and Western Europe began to be transmitted to the Soviet population, along with western popular culture.

Outside the Soviet Union
Glasnost received mixed reception in communist states, especially outside the Eastern Bloc.

Support
Glasnost and similar reforms were applied in the following communist states:
 Bulgaria
 Czechoslovakia
 East Germany
 Hungary
 Mongolia
 Poland
 Vietnam (see đổi mới)

Furthermore, in the socialist state of Yugoslavia, similar reforms also existed, with the first major reforms beginning in Slovenia.

Opposition
Glasnost or similar reforms were not applied in the following communist states:
 China (had its own non-Soviet-inspired reforms)
 Cuba
 Laos
 North Korea
 Romania (opposed by Nicolae Ceaușescu)

In Russia since 1991
The outright prohibition of censorship was enshrined in Article 29 of the new 1993 Constitution of the Russian Federation. This however has been the subject of ongoing controversy in contemporary Russia owing to heightened governmental interventions restricting access to information for Russian citizens, including internet censorship. There has also been pressure on government-operated media outlets to not publicize or discuss certain events or subjects in recent years. Monitoring of the infringement of media rights in the years from 2004 to 2013 found that instances of censorship were the most commonly reported type of violation.

See also
 1965 Glasnost rally
 Demokratizatsiya (Gorbachev's "Democratization")
 Glasnost Bowl
 Perestroika (Gorbachev's "Restructuring")
 Uskoreniye (Gorbachev's "Acceleration")
 Common knowledge (logic)
 Mutual knowledge
 Pluralistic ignorance
 Stag hunt

Notes

References

Soviet phraseology
Soviet internal politics
Transparency (behavior)
Dissolution of the Soviet Union
Mikhail Gorbachev
1980s in the Soviet Union
Political catchphrases
Perestroika
Reform in the Soviet Union
Soviet democracy movements
Russian words and phrases
Ideology of the Communist Party of the Soviet Union
1980s in politics